Lobke Berkhout (born 11 November 1980 in Amsterdam) is a sailor from the Netherlands who represented her country at the 2008 Summer Olympics in Qingdao. With helmsman Marcelien de Koning Berkhout took the silver medal as crew in the Women's 470. Berkhout returned as crew member to the 2012 Olympic regatta's in Weymouth in the 470. With helmsman Lisa Westerhof Berkhout took the bronze medal in the Women's 470.

Awards

 Order of Orange-Nassau

References

External links
 
 
 

  
  
  
  

Living people
1980 births
Dutch female sailors (sport)
Sailors at the 2008 Summer Olympics – 470
Sailors at the 2012 Summer Olympics – 470
Olympic sailors of the Netherlands
Olympic silver medalists for the Netherlands
Olympic bronze medalists for the Netherlands
Sportspeople from Amsterdam
Olympic medalists in sailing
Medalists at the 2008 Summer Olympics
Medalists at the 2012 Summer Olympics
Knights of the Order of Orange-Nassau
World champions in sailing for the Netherlands
470 class world champions
Sailors at the 2020 Summer Olympics – 470